Chiu is a romanization of various Chinese surnames, based on different varieties of Chinese. It may correspond to the surnames spelled in the following ways in Mandarin pinyin:
 Zhào or Zhāo, from the Cantonese pronunciation
 Zhāng, from the Hokkien pronunciation; more commonly spelled Teoh or Teo
 Zhōu, from the Hokkien pronunciation
 Qiū or Qiú, from a variant of the Mandarin Wade–Giles spelling Ch'iu
 Jiù, from the Mandarin Wade–Giles spelling

Notable people
 Angie Chiu (born 1954), Hong Kong actress
 Only Won (born Baldwin Chiu, 1974), American musician, actor, and producer
 Chiu Ban It (– 2016), Singaporean Anglican bishop
 Barbara Chiu, Canadian table tennis player
 Ben Chiu (born 1970), Taiwan-born American technology entrepreneur
 Bondy Chiu (born 1973), Hong Kong actress and singer
 Bryan Chiu (born 1974), Canadian footballer; centre in the Canadian Football League
 Caroline Chiu (born 1984), Hong Kong swimmer
 Chiu Chang (born 1950), Taiwanese Democratic Progressive Party politician
 Chiu Chi-ling (born 1943), Hong Kong actor
 Chiu Chih-wei (born 1972), Taiwanese Democratic Progressive Party politician
 Chiu Ching-chun (born 1949), Taiwanese Kuomintang politician, magistrate of Hsinchu County
 Chiu Chuang-chin (born 1956), Taiwanese Democratic Progressive Party politician
 Chiu Chuang-huan (born 1925), Taiwanese politician, Vice-Premier from 1981 to 1984
 Chiu Chuang-liang (born 1955), Taiwanese Democratic Progressive Party politician
 Chiu Chui-cheng, Taiwanese politician, Mainland Affairs Council member
 Chiu Chun Kit (born 1983), Hong Kong football defender
 Connie Chiu (born 1969), Hong Kong-born Swedish fashion model
 David Chiu (politician) (born 1970), American politician in California
 David Chiu (poker player) (born 1960), American professional poker player
 David Jung-Kuang Chiu (1936–2006), American academic
 Deacon Chiu (1924–2015), Hong Kong businessman
 Donna Chiu (born 1965), Taiwanese singer
 Frederic Chiu (born 1964), American concert pianist 
 Chiu Fu-sheng (born 1947), Taiwanese real estate developer and film producer
 Gian Chiu (born 1989), Filipino basketball player
 Chiu Hin Chun (born 1994), Hong Kong rower
 Chiu Hin-kwong (born 1928), Hong Kong doctor and politician
 Hong-Yee Chiu (born 1932), Shanghai-born American astrophysicist
 Chiu I-huan (born 1990), Taiwanese football striker
 Chiu Kuo-cheng (born 1953), Taiwanese general
 Chiu Jeng-jiann, Taiwanese politician, Deputy Minister of Science and Technology
 Chiu Keng Guan, Malaysian film director
 Kim Chiu (born 1990), Filipina actress
 Melissa Chiu (born 1972), Australian museum curator
 Paul Chiu (born 1947), Taiwanese Kuomintang politician
 Chiu Ping-kun (born 1964), Taiwanese athlete and judge in the sport of archery
 Prince Chiu (born 1989), Taiwanese singer
 Roy Chiu (born 1981), Taiwanese actor
 Rebecca Chiu (born 1978), Hong Kong professional squash player
 Samson Chiu, Hong Kong film director
 Sharlene Chiu, Canadian television reporter
 Chiu Tai-san (born 1956), Taiwanese Democratic Progressive Party politician
 Tom Chiu (born 1971), Taiwan-born American music composer and violinist
 Chiu Tsui-ling (born 1994), Taiwanese singer in Japan
 Chiu Tzu-tsung, Taiwanese politician, Atomic Energy Council member
 Wah Chiu, Hong Kong-born American biophysicist
 Chiu Wen-ta (born 1950), Taiwanese medical educator and politician
 Chiu Yi (born 1956), Taiwanese Kuomintang politician, member of the Legislative Yuan for Kaohsiung
 Chiu Yi-ying (born 1971), Taiwanese Democratic Progressive Party politician
 Chiu Yu-hung (born 1994), Taiwanese football goalkeeper
 Chiu Yu Ming (born 1991), Hong Kong football goalkeeper

Fictional characters 
 Chiu, net idol alter ego of Chisame Hasegawa, from the manga/anime franchise Negima!
Candy Chiu, a character from Gravity Falls

See also

Chew (disambiguation)
Chic (disambiguation)
Chik (disambiguation)
Chu (disambiguation)

References

Chinese-language surnames
Multiple Chinese surnames